Lorenzo Iglecias "Larry" De Leon Guerrero (January 25, 1935 – October 6, 2006) was a Northern Mariana Islander politician who served as the third governor of the Northern Mariana Islands from 1990 to 1994 and the first president of the Northern Mariana Islands Senate from 1978 to 1980. He was a member of the CNMI Republican Party.

Early life
Guerrero was born on January 25, 1935, to his parents Pedro Taitingfong Deleon Guerrero and Carmen Celis Iglecias of Saipan.

Career
Guerrero first held elective office in 1972 when he took office as a senator in the Northern Mariana Islands' legislature at the time. He served in that body until it was replaced by the Commonwealth Legislature in 1980, at which time he served as the President of the Northern Mariana Islands Senate until 1982. He chaired the Northern Mariana Islands Republican Party from 1983 to 1985. He was elected governor in 1989 and served from 1990 to 1994, when he was succeeded by Froilan Tenorio. Guerrero was the vice president of the Saipan Shipping Company from 1973 to 1976 and worked for the Philippine, Micronesia and the Orient Navigation Company for over a decade. He owned and managed the Commonwealth Maritime Agency in Saipan from 1980 until 1989 when he won the governorship.

In 1997, Guerrero unsuccessfully ran for governor with running mate, Rita Inos, who became the first woman to run for lieutenant governor of the Northern Mariana Islands at the time.

Personal life 
Guerrero died on October 6, 2006, after a long illness. A state funeral was held. Guerrero, the first of the CNMI's elected governors to pass away, was survived by his wife, ten children, and about forty grandchildren and great-grandchildren. The funeral mass were held at the Kristo Rai Church and Nuestra Senora de la Paz Chapel. He was buried at the Mount Carmel Cemetery (Chalan Kanoa Cemetery) in Saipan. Guerrero was married to Matilde Salas Villagomez Deleon Guerrero and had thirteen children, Aida, Joaquin, Margarita, Frances, Gloria, Emiliana, Dolores, Lorenza, Lorenzo Jr., Magdalena, Raymond, Patricia, and Edith.

References

External links
NGA Profile
Saipan Tribune: Guerrero laid to rest

|-

1935 births
2006 deaths
20th-century American politicians
Burials in the Northern Mariana Islands
Governors of the Northern Mariana Islands
People from Saipan
Presidents of the Northern Mariana Islands Senate
Republican Party (Northern Mariana Islands) politicians
Republican Party governors of the Northern Mariana Islands